The second 1962 Major League Baseball All-Star Game was the 33rd playing of Major League Baseball's annual midsummer exhibition game. The game took place at Wrigley Field in Chicago, Illinois, home of the National League's Chicago Cubs. The American League emerged triumphant as they finally broke out of a five-game slump with nine runs. The nine runs equaled their total for the previous five games. The AL also racked up ten hits. Their victory kept the National League from tying the All-Star series at 16–16. The AL also had home runs by Pete Runnels, Leon Wagner and Rocky Colavito. A highlight of the game was the first presentation of the Arch Ward Trophy to the MVPs of each All-Star Game. It was first presented in 1962 as a tribute to Arch Ward, the man who founded the All-Star Game in 1933. That first presentation went to Leon Wagner of the Los Angeles Angels (second game MVP) and to Maury Wills of the Los Angeles Dodgers (first game MVP), because two Midsummer Classics were played.

Roster
Ralph Houk's coaching staff included Hank Bauer and Bill Rigney, while Fred Hutchinson's staff included Harry Craft and Birdie Tebbetts.

Players in italics have since been inducted into the National Baseball Hall of Fame.

American League

National League

Game

Starting lineups

Umpires

Game summary

References

External links
 1962 All-Star Game on Baseball Almanac
 1962 All-Star Game on Baseball-Reference.com

Major League Baseball All-Star Game
Major League Baseball All-Star Game
Major League Baseball All Star Game
July 1962 sports events in the United States
Baseball competitions in Chicago
1960s in Chicago